Black and White is a 1999 American film directed by James Toback and starring Robert Downey Jr., Gaby Hoffmann, Allan Houston, Jared Leto, Scott Caan, Claudia Schiffer, Brooke Shields, Bijou Phillips and members of the Wu-Tang Clan (Raekwon, Method Man, Ghostface Killah, Oli "Power" Grant, Masta Killa, Bruce Lamar Mayfield "Chip Banks" and Inspectah Deck) and Onyx (Fredro Starr and Sticky Fingaz). The film also features Ben Stiller as a sleazy police detective, as well as Mike Tyson playing himself and Michael B. Jordan in his film debut. It had its first showing at the Telluride Film Festival on September 4, 1999, followed by a second screening at the Toronto International Film Festival on September 15, 1999. It had its theatrical release in the United States on April 5, 2000.

Plot 
Rich Bower (Power) is a mover and shaker in the world of rap music (he's involved with a number of other licit and illicit business ventures as well), and his apartment is a favored meeting place for musicians, hangers-on, and hipsters who want to seem cool, including a gang of white kids who want to be on the inside of what they consider the coolest scene of the day. Sam (Shields), a filmmaker, is making a documentary about Rich and his circle, with the help of her husband Terry (Downey), a homosexual who doesn't feel at home in this milieu.

Dean (Houston) is Rich's black friend since childhood and a skilled college basketball player. He is offered a deal by a bookmaker, Mark (Stiller) to throw a game for a price. Dean takes the money against his better judgment, and he soon realizes how much of a mistake he made when Mark turns out to be a cop hoping to dig up dirt on Rich. Rich in turn discovers that Dean might be forced to tell what he knows to stay out of jail, and he decides that Dean has to be killed; however, rather than murder his friend himself, Rich asks one of the white kids who hangs out with him, who seems especially eager to prove himself, to do it for him. The kid, however, is actually the son of the District Attorney.

Cast 

 Robert Downey Jr. as Terry Donager
 Gaby Hoffmann as Raven
 Allan Houston as Dean Carter
 Jared Leto as Casey
 Scott Caan as Scotty
 Stacy Edwards as Sheila King
 Kidada Jones as Jesse
 Marla Maples as Muffy
 Joe Pantoliano as Bill King
 Bijou Phillips as Charlie
 Oli "Power" Grant as Rich Bower
 Raekwon as Cigar
 Claudia Schiffer as Greta
 William Lee Scott as Will King
 Brooke Shields as Sam Donager
 Ben Stiller as Detective Mark Clear
 Eddie Kaye Thomas as Marty King
 Frank Adonis as Frank
 Elijah Wood as Wren
 Mike Tyson as himself
 Jaime McAdams as James
 Michael B. Jordan as Teen number 2

Production 
Most of the script was improvised by the cast. All of Claudia Schiffer's lines were completely written.

Because she had not had them done previously, Claudia Schiffer had to have her ears pierced especially for the large hoop earrings worn by her character. In addition to wearing fake dreadlocks, Brooke Shields also wore a nose ring for this film, for which she had her nose temporarily pierced.

Reception
Review aggregate Rotten Tomatoes reports that 38% of critics have given the film a positive review based on 82 reviews; the critical consensus states, "The atmosphere is affecting, and the story, at times, is compelling, but with a lean script and limp direction, Black and White doesn't add up to much." On Metacritic, which assigns an average rating out of 100 based on review s from film critics, the film has a rating score of 47%, aggregating 27 reviews. Roger Ebert gave the film three out of four stars.

In the United States, Black and White grossed $5,241,315 in its four-week release.

See also
 List of American films of 1999
 Black and White (soundtrack)

References

External links
 
 
 

1999 crime drama films
1999 LGBT-related films
1999 films
American crime drama films
American independent films
American LGBT-related films
Films about race and ethnicity
Films directed by James Toback
Films set in New York City
Hood films
Screen Gems films
1990s English-language films
1990s American films